The Purnululu National Park is a World Heritage Site in the East Kimberley region of Western Australia. Declared a World Heritage Site in 2003, the park was inscribed as follows:

Purnululu National Park World Heritage site 

The World Heritage status of the region was created and negotiated in 2003, and the adopted boundary of the existing national park. Since its listing, the Government of Western Australia has reserved additional areas located adjacent to the World Heritage Area, including the Purnululu Conservation Park and the Ord River Regeneration Reserve.

Etymology 
Purnululu is a mispronounced Djaru word for the area around Bungle Bungle out camp, which is referred to as Bullmanlulu. The correct Karjaganujaru name for the Bungle Bungle massif is Billingjal which means sand falling away.

The traditional owners of the area are the Karjaganujaru peoples.

Features 
It is famous for the sandstone domes, unusual and visually striking with their striping in alternating orange and grey bands. The banding of the domes is due to differences in clay content and porosity of the sandstone layers: the orange bands consist of oxidised iron compounds in layers that dry out too quickly for cyanobacteria to multiply; the grey bands are composed of cyanobacteria growing on the surface of layers of sandstone where moisture accumulates.

Geology 
The Bungle Bungle Range is one of the most extensive and impressive occurrences of sandstone tower (or cone) karst terrain in the world. The Bungle Bungles were a plateau of Devonian sandstone,  carved into a mass of beehive-shaped towers with regularly alternating, dark gray bands of cyanobacterial crust (single cell photosynthetic organisms). The cone-towers are steep-sided, with an abrupt break of slope at the base and have domed summits. How they were formed is not yet completely understood. Their surface is fragile but stabilized by crusts of iron oxide and bacteria. They provide an outstanding example of land formation by dissolutional weathering of sandstone, with removal of sand grains by wind, rain and sheet wash on slopes.

Access 
Safely navigating it takes approximately three hours. Access by air is less demanding; helicopter flights are available from Bellburn Airstrip in the national park, and from Warmun roadhouse. Scenic light aircraft flights are also available out of Kununurra and Lake Argyle.

Gallery

See also 

 Protected areas of Western Australia
 Kimberley (Western Australia)

References

Further reading 
 Hoatsan, Dean et al.(1997) Bungle Bungle Range : Purnululu National Park, East Kimberley, Western Australia : a guide to the rocks, landforms, plants, animals, and human impact Canberra : Australian Geological Survey Organisation.

External links 

World heritage listing for Purnululu National Park
Purnululu National Park

National parks of Western Australia
World Heritage Sites in Western Australia
Geology of Western Australia
Kimberley (Western Australia)
Protected areas established in 1987
Australian National Heritage List
1987 establishments in Australia